The Mary Erskine School, popularly known as "Mary Erskine's" or "MES", is an all-girls private secondary school in Edinburgh, Scotland. It was founded in 1694 and has a roll of around 750 pupils. It is the sister school of the all-boys Stewart's Melville College (SMC) with which MES shares a coeducational nursery and junior school for pupils aged 3–11.

The majority of its pupils live in the surrounding area (Edinburgh, Lothian and Fife) but boarding facilities are available. About 3% of the pupils are boarders.  The school is non-denominational but claims to have a broadly Christian outlook.

Both MES and SMC are managed by the Merchant Company of Edinburgh which is also responsible for the city's George Watson's College. In 2014 the combined Erskine Stewarts Melville school claimed to be the largest independent school in Europe.

Although the school is single sex, some activities, although not teaching, are carried out jointly with the boys from SMC. The sixth (final) year of the school is co-educational.

History
The school was founded as a hospital school for the daughters of Edinburgh burgesses in 1694 as the Merchant Maiden Hospital by Mary Erskine (a prominent Edinburgh banking businesswoman) and the Company of Merchants of the City of Edinburgh in the first Merchants' Hall in Cowgate, Edinburgh.  In 1870, it was refounded by act of Parliament as a day school, renamed as the Edinburgh Educational Institution For Girls and had grown to 1,200 girl students.  In 1871 it moved its premises to Queen Street, Edinburgh and became familiarly known as Queen Street School.  The school was renamed again as Edinburgh Ladies' College in 1889, and to its present name, "The Mary Erskine School", in 1944.

In 1966 the school moved to Ravelston, Edinburgh and in 1977 the Mary Erskine School merged with an all-boys independent secondary school Stewart's Melville College which is located approximately one mile (2 km) from the MES campus and The Erskine Stewart's Melville Schools (ESMS) was formed.  Together MES and SMC have a co-educational Junior School which caters for pupils from three to 11 years old. Nursery to Primary 3 are housed on the Mary Erskine campus, with Primary 4 to 7 on the Stewart's Melville campus.  The combined sixth (final) form of both schools is coeducational.

Mary Erskine School was voted the Scottish Independent School of the year in 2012.

Sport
The school is involved in a wide variety of sports, most of which are coached by mixture of staff from general departments as well as the Physical Education (PE) department staff.  Sports include Aerobics, Athletics, Badminton, Basketball, Cricket, Cross-country, Curling, Dance, Equestrian, Fencing, Football, Golf, ice skating, Highland Dancing, Hockey, Sailing, Skiing, Squash, Swimming, Tennis and Volleyball.

Hockey
MES excels particularly in hockey, with over 6 teams competing at senior level and many pupils playing at National level. Pupils have the opportunity to play for the Erksine Stewart's Melville Former Pupil Hockey Club once leaving sixth form. MES also has P.E teachers and former pupils playing hockey for Scotland and Great Britain.

Ravelston Sports Club
"Ravelston Sports Club" is a large on-site sports centre and gym opened in 2000 and is split across both campuses.  The sports centre is mainly used by pupils for PE lessons and sports training, but is also open to members of the public with a monthly membership fee.  Extensive rugby and cricket pitches and athletics facilities are located at the school's sports grounds in Inverleith.

Music and Drama
Almost 800 children sing regularly in choirs performing in all kinds of venues from the Usher Hall to St Peter's in the Vatican, from Songs of Praise to sharing the stage with the Scottish Chamber Orchestra. In addition to this 300 children from Primary 4 to senior sixth Form play in school orchestras and bands (including Pipe Band and Jazz Band).

Boys and girls from the Junior School have had favourable reviews while performing over 680 times in professional West End touring musicals including over 220 appearances in Joseph and the Amazing Technicolor Dreamcoat. Senior pupils have won prestigious scholarships to American Drama Schools and starred on TV.

Pupils have access to and frequently perform in SMC's "Tom Fleming Centre for Performing Arts" (formerly "Performing Arts Centre").

Carbisdale

Since 1965, the school has organised an outdoor education programme for the boys of SMC and the girls from MES in the third senior year. It is located in the north of Scotland at Carbisdale Castle,  a historic castle which has been converted into a Youth Hostel. The trip consists of a number of outdoor activities that vary from year to year including hillwalking, orienteering, golf, kayaking, team-building activities, visits to nearby historic sites and environmental studies of the surrounding woodland. Carbisdale Castle has a plaque of the Stewart's Melville College badge in its foyer above the main door.

Pastoral
Between First Senior Year and Fifth Year pupils are split into house groups. There are six different houses (named after areas of Scotland):
 Appin
 Ettrick
 Galloway
 Kintyre
 Lochaber
 Torridon

Each house has a Head of House tutor as well as a form tutor for each year group who is responsible for pupils' well-being.

These houses correspond with the houses of the same names at Stewart's Melville College, and are the basis for the 'ESM Challenge'. This is a series of annual events involving both the boys and girls in each house. It covers a wide variety of school societies, ranging from the House Music Competition to the Inter-house Hockey. The competition comes to a climax on Sports Day with a 4 × 100 m relay between each house. The winning house is then awarded a cup at the school's prizegiving ceremony.

Senior Sixth form
When pupils enter the sixth (final) form they are merged with the boys from Stewart's Melville College.  Classes take place at both school sites, with buses operating regularly to transfer students between the two.  There are approximately 240 students in a normal year group.

In sixth form students are largely independent. Students have a tutor (twinned with another at the other site) with whom they register in the morning, and who also helps them with their British university UCAS applications. 

All members of the sixth form are prefects and are expected to help out with duties around the school sites. The maintenance of the prefect body is the responsibility of a Head Boy and a Head Girl, along with five deputy head boys and five deputy head girls.

School Uniform and Colours

In 1994 the school adopted the present uniform which includes a navy blue and red kilt designed by the company Kinloch Anderson, a blue blazer, white blouse and red tie.

Colours and Half-Colours can be awarded in Sixth Form to pupils who excel in non-academic areas (such as music, drama and individual sports).

Examinations
Pupils at Mary Erskine's mainly sit Scottish Qualifications Authority (SQA) examinations, including (as of 2013) National 4, National 5, Higher Grade and Advanced Higher Grade levels.  The English GCE Advanced Level examinations can also be sat in art and music. As is the case with many independent schools MES has examination results well above the national average. For example, in 2013, 86% of pupils passed Higher grade exams at the A or B level and passed an average of five Higher Grade exams each.  Almost all leavers were planning to go on to higher education. In 2015, popular destinations included St Andrews (11), Glasgow (18), Edinburgh Napier (3), Aberdeen (12), Newcastle (2) and Northumbria (5). In 2014 and 2016, Mary Erskine's was top of the Sunday Times list of independent secondary schools in Scotland using the Scottish Examinations system and in 2015 was judged the best Scottish School by Advanced Highers by Best-Schools.

Former Pupils Guild
Upon leaving MES, students have the opportunity to join the Mary Erskine Former Pupils Guild which was founded in 1884.

Notable former staff
 Elisabeth West in 1708, diarist

Notable alumni

Media and Arts
 Lynda Cochrane - pianist 
 Margaret Stirling Dobson - painter, printmaker and author.
 Joanna Drew (1929–2003) - art gallery director and arts administrator
 Jenny Foulds - actress, e.g. Two Thousand Acres of Sky)
 Alison Geissler (1907-2011) - glass engraver
 Frances Grey - actress 
 Dorothy Mackie Low (1916–2002) - writer of romance novels who used the pseudonyms Dorothy Mackie Low, Lois Paxton, and Zoë Cass. 
 Samara MacLaren - actress
 Freya Mavor - actress
 Chloe Pirrie - actress
 Margaret Stoddart (1865–1934) - notable New Zealand artist
 Madeleine Worrall - actress

Academia and Science
 Dame Maria Gordon DBE, (1864–1939) - geologist and palaeontologist, first woman to get a DSc from London University and a PhD from the University of Munich.
 Ellen Charlotte Higgins (1871–1951) - principal of the Royal Holloway College, University of London
 Professor Sheila Scott Macintyre (1910–1960) - mathematician best known for her work on the Whittaker constant.
 Professor Anna MacGillivray Macleod (1917–2004) - first female professor of Brewing and Biochemistry in the world.
 Elizabeth Malloch (1910–2000) - educator and priest
 Dr Annie Hutton Numbers (1897-1988), British mathematician and chemist
 Dr Winifred Rushforth OBE, (1885–1983) - Jungian psychoanalyst
 Dr Isabel Emslie Hutton CBE (1887–1960) - physician

Sports
 Shauna Mullin - athlete, 2012 Olympic Games, Beach Volleyball)
 Janice Rankin - Olympic Gold Medallist for curling 2002
Lynsey Sharp - athlete – 2012 European Champion 800m, 2012 Olympic semi-finalist 800m, 2014 Commonwealth silver medallist

Politics
Louise Mary Eates (married name) - suffragette
Elaine Murray - MSP

Business 

 Judy Wagner, FRSE  - British business leader, educator and executive search recruitment manager

References

Sources

External links
 
 Mary Erskine School's page on Scottish Schools Online
 Profile on the ISC website
 Profile at MyDaughter

Private schools in Edinburgh
Educational institutions established in the 1690s
Boarding schools in Edinburgh
Girls' schools in Edinburgh
Member schools of the Girls' Schools Association
Category A listed buildings in Edinburgh
1694 establishments in Scotland
Diamond schools